Nakhonratchasima Mazda Football Club (Thai สโมสรฟุตบอลจังหวัดนครราชสีมา), commonly known as Korat, is a professional football club based in Nakhon Ratchasima, Thailand. They play in the Thai League 1.

History

1999–2008: Beginnings
Nakhonratchasima FC were formed in 1999. After spending fourteen-years of their history in provincial leagues  of the Thai Football League this big club won promotion to League 1 in 2011. The league this big club and City deserves.

Since seasons 2007 are covered in detail below.

In 2007, despite finishing fourth from bottom in a twelve-team division (in Division 1), 'Korat' were relegated to the newly formed third tier of the Thai football pyramid because of league restructuring

The Division Two years
In 2008, Korat finished fourth in the now defunct Division 2 Group A. Korat started the season slowly but embarked on a five-game winning streak in the middle third of the season which gave them a chance of promotion. However, a disappointing run-in meant that Korat eventually finished fourth.

In 2009, Korat finished second in the inaugural Division 2 Northeast. Despite leading the division for most of the season, they slipped to second on the final day as they drew 1–1 at home with Nakhon Phanom FC whilst title rivals Loei City beat Chaiyaphum United 1–0 meaning that Loei took the title and the sole promotion play-offs spot on the final day of the season. Korat also reached the quarter-finals of the FA Cup (the only Regional League side to make it to that stage) but lost to TPL side Thai Port FC.

In 2010, the club finished fourth in the expanded 16-team Northeast Division. Another high finish but they were far behind the top two of Loei and Buriram. Head coach Mann Jantanarm resigned after the 4–0 away defeat to Buriram F.C. and was replaced by a member of the backroom staff, Vichan Cha-on Sri. Despite a successful FA Cup run in 2009, the club fell at the first hurdle in the 2010 competition as they lost 2–1 away at F.C. Phuket. They were slightly more successful in the relaunched League Cup. Loei City were beaten 3–1 at the 80th Birthday Stadium in the preliminary round. This set up a first round proper clash with TPL side Samut Songkhram F.C. to be played over two legs. A good first leg performance saw Korat go down just 1–0 to opponents ranked two divisions higher. In the second leg, however, Korat lost 7–0 as the class of the opposition finally told.

The 2011 season saw the club more than make up for the disappointment of 2009. Under the guidance of a new president, Phollapee Suwanchawee, and a new coach, Tewet Kamolsin, the team achieved promotion.
Midway through the season, the club was docked nine points for fielding an ineligible player (goalkeeper Kiattisak Lertwilai). Despite the deduction, and thanks to the re-signing of Prompong Kransumrong, the side recovered from the penalty and clinched a place in the end-of-season play-offs (the 'Champions League') by defeating Mahasarakham 1–0 on the final day of the season. Nakhon Ratchasima were placed in Group B of the Champions League along with fellow Isaan side Roiet, Rayong, Krabi, Lamphun and North Bangkok. This time, Korat were the beneficiaries of a points deduction. After losing 2–1 to Roiet in their first Champions League match, Korat were awarded all three points as Roiet fielded six foreign players – one more than is allowed. Korat went on to win seven, draw one and lose two of their Champions League matches, and finished top of the group on 22 points. As such, promotion to 2012 TPL Division 1 was secured along with runners-up Krabi, and Ratchaburi and Pattalung from Group A.

The Division One years and promotion
Korat's first season back in the second tier ended with an eighth-place finish in 2012. Head coach Tewet Kamolsin was sacked in May 2012 and replaced by Brazilian Reuther Moreira. He too was released by the club after the season finished and was replaced by Arjhan Srong-ngamsub.

Crests history
The original club crest was a giant cat or it called in their area as the Korat cat that originating in Thailand, it is named after the Nakhon Ratchasima province (typically called "Korat" by the Thai people. In Thailand, the breed is known as Si-Sawat, meaning "colour of the sawat seed" and this Si-Sawat became a nickname of the club The Swat Cats. The Korat is known colloquially as the "good luck cat". Traditionally, they are given in pairs to newlyweds or people who are highly esteemed, for good luck. Until recently, Korats were not sold, but only given as gifts.
 
The new badge was approved by board in 2016 and was introduced in the 2017 season. It was designed by Farmgroup a design consultancy based in Bangkok.

Title sponsors

Stadium

Korat play in the 80th Birthday Stadium which was the main stadium for the 2007 SEA Games. Korat moved to the stadium in the middle of the 2008 season having previously played at the city's Central Stadium. They also played home games in the town of Pak Chong when the Central Stadium was being renovated for the SEA Games during the 2007 season. The club originally played at the Suranaree Base Central Stadium close to Nakhon Ratchasima city centre. This was their main home stadium from 1999 to 2006, although they occasionally played at Nakhon Ratchasima Rajabhat University Stadium and Suranaree University of Technology stadium during this period.

Supporters

Despite the city of Korat having a population in excess of 400,000 and Nakhon Ratchasima Province having a population in excess of 2.5 million, Korat struggled to attract more than 400 for most home games throughout their history. This situation was addressed in the 2009 season as Division 2 was relaunched as the Regional League. Korat were now playing in a division composed solely of other clubs from Issan. The club was extensively promoted and publicized around the city with the result that attendances have been in excess of 1,000 since just 258 turned up to watch the match against Roi Et FC in May 2009. Some 4,500 were in attendance for Korat's home game with Nakhon Phanom in September 2009, and the matches against Loei, Pattaya United and Sakhon Nakhon were also watched by crowds in excess of 3,000.

Attendances rose again throughout the 2011 promotion season. They peaked in the final play-off match against Roiet when around 13,000 witnessed a 1–0 win on 17 December 2011.

Stadium and locations

Season by season domestic record

P = Played
W = Games won
D = Games drawn
L = Games lost
F = Goals for
A = Goals against
Pts = Points
Pos = Final position
N/A = No answer

TL = Thai League 1

QR1 = First Qualifying Round
QR2 = Second Qualifying Round
QR3 = Third Qualifying Round
QR4 = Fourth Qualifying Round
RInt = Intermediate Round
R1 = Round 1
R2 = Round 2
R3 = Round 3

R4 = Round 4
R5 = Round 5
R6 = Round 6
GR = Group stage
QF = Quarter-finals
SF = Semi-finals
RU = Runners-up
S = Shared
W = Winners

Players

Current squad

Out on loan

Club Officials

Coaches

 Man Chantanam 
 Wichan Chaonsri 
 Tewesh Kamolsin 
 Arjhan Srong-ngamsub 
 Ruither Moraira 
 Sugao Kambe 
 Miloš Joksić 
 Chalermwoot Sa-ngapol 
 Teerasak Po-on 
 Kevin Blackwell 
 Teerasak Po-on

Honours

Domestic leagues

Thai Division 1 League
Winners (1): 2014

Domestic Cups
 FA Cup
Runners-up (1): 2021-22

References

External links 

  
 https://www.facebook.com/swatcatofficial/

 
Thai League 1 clubs
Association football clubs established in 1999
Football clubs in Thailand
Sport in Nakhon Ratchasima province
1999 establishments in Thailand